Tafilah, also spelled Tafila, is a town with a population of 27,559 people in southern Jordan, located  southwest of Amman. It is the capital of Tafilah Governorate. It is well known for having green gardens which contain olive and fig trees, and grape-vines. Tafilah was first built by the Edomites and was called Tophel.

There are more than 360 natural springs in the at-Tafilah area, including the natural reservoir of Dana and hot natural springs at Afra and Burbeita. There are two phosphate and cement mines in at-Tafilah, which are one of the country's main income sources.

History

Iron Age to Crusader period
The oldest state formation established in the region on Tafilah was the kingdom of Edom, and Tafilah lies on the ruins of the Edomite city of Tophel. The capital of Edom was at Busairah 23 km to the south of Tafilah. Tafilah was later annexed by the Nabatean kingdom who, had its capital at Petra. Following the Roman invasion, it was ruled by the Ghassanids, under Byzantine authority. Tafilah then came under Muslim rule, interrupted for a brief period of time by Crusader rule.

Arab Revolt against Ottoman rule
During the Arab Revolt, in January 1918, the village and the region around it were captured in the Battle of Tafilah, thanks to what was described as a "brilliant feat of arms", by Arab troops under the command of T.E. Lawrence, Jaafar Pasha Al-Askari, and Prince Zeid bin Hussein.

Population
In 1961 there were 4,506 inhabitants in Tafila.

Education 
There is one university in Tafilah, Tafila Technical University. Founded in 1986 as a university college, it expanded to a university in 2005. The university as of the academic year 2009/2010 includes six colleges.

Districts
The city of Tafilah is organized into six districts:

 Al Ees (منطقة العيص)
 Al Baqee' (منطقة البقيع)
 Wadi Zaid (منطقة وادي زيد)
 Aimah (منطقة عيمه)
 Al Hussein (منطقة الحسين )
 Ain Al Baidha (منطقة العين البيضاء)
 Al Mansoura (منطقه المنصوره)

Tourism
Although Tafilah Governorate is rich in history, having been the nucleus of the ancient kingdom of Edom, it has one of the lowest numbers of tourists in Jordan. This is due to the fact that Tafilah is off the beaten track; Jordan's main highways do not pass through or nearby the city. The two main highways connecting north to south Jordan are the Dead Sea Highway (Highway 65) and the Desert Highway (Highway 15). To go to Tafilah from the Desert Highway, one must take Highway 60 west at Jurf Al Darawish.

The nearby traditional village of Dana and the Dana Biosphere Reserve in Wadi Dana is a unique tourist attraction.

References

Bibliography

Populated places in Tafilah Governorate